Brown Eyed Soul (hangul: 브라운 아이드 소울) is a four member South Korean R&B group.

History
Brown Eyed Soul released their debut album, Soul Free, on September 17, 2003. From it the single Jeongmal Saranghaesseulkka (정말 사랑했을까) topped the KBS charts in October of that year .

After their debut they took 4 years to record their 2nd album The Wind, The Sea, The Rain, which was released on November 2, 2007. Their 2nd album sold about 100,000 copies. It helped them win the R&B award at the 5th Korean Music awards in 2008.

In 2010, they made their comeback to the music industry by releasing the 3 singles I’ll Make Way, Blowin My Mind on April 7, Love Ballad, Never Forget on May 10, & Can’t Stop Lovin’ You on July 6. In the music video of the song I’ll Make Way (a.k.a. I’ll Move), besides the actress Lee Da-hae, all the Brown Eyed Soul members made their appearance together for the first time. This MV also came in 2 versions: 1 Black & White, & the other a Colour version.

Members
 Ahn Jung-yeop (안정엽)
 Yoo Na-ul (유나얼)
 Go Young-jun (고영준)
 Sung Hoon (성훈)

Discography

Studio albums

Live albums

Extended plays

Single albums

Singles

Other charted songs

Awards

See also 
 Brown Eyes
 Brown Eyed Girls

References

External links 

 
 Facebook
 Twitter
 YouTube

South Korean contemporary R&B musical groups
Musical groups established in 2003
K-pop music groups
South Korean boy bands
Korean Music Award winners